Minister of State for Overseas Development may refer to:

Minister of State with responsibility for Overseas Development, a junior ministerial style held by a Minister of State at the Department of Foreign Affairs in the Irish Government
Secretary of State for International Development, a senior ministerial office in the British Government